Project Tiger  is a tiger conservation programme launched in November 1973 by the Government of India during Prime Minister Indira Gandhi's tenure. The project aims at ensuring a viable population of the Bengal tiger in its natural habitats, protecting it from extinction, and preserving areas of biological importance as a natural heritage that represent the diversity of ecosystems across the tiger's range in the country. The project's task force visualised these tiger reserves as breeding nuclei, from which surplus animals would migrate to adjacent forests. Funds and commitment were mustered to support the intensive program of habitat protection and rehabilitation under the project. 

During the tiger census of 2006, a new methodology was used extrapolating site-specific densities of tigers, their co-predators and prey derived from camera trap and sign surveys using GIS. Based on the result of these surveys, the total tiger population was estimated at 1,411 individuals ranging from 1,165 to 1,657 adult and sub-adult tigers of more than 1.5 years of age. It was claimed that owing to the project, the number of tigers increased to 2,603–3,346 individuals by 2018.
In a testimony to the success of Project Tiger, in 2022, 54th tiger reserve in India was declared in Ranipur Wildlife Sanctuary, Uttar Pradesh, being the State’s fourth tiger reserve.

Objectives

Project Tiger's main aims are to:
Reduce factors that lead to the depletion of tiger habitats and to mitigate them by suitable management. The damages done to the habitat shall be rectified to facilitate the recovery of the ecosystem to the maximum possible extent.
Ensure a viable tiger population for economic, scientific, cultural, aesthetic and ecological values.

The monitoring system M-STrIPES was developed to assist patrol and protect tiger habitats. It maps patrol routes and allows forest guards to enter sightings, events and changes when patrolling. It generates protocols based on these data, so that management decisions can be adapted.

Management and population 

Project Tiger was administered by the National Tiger Conservation Authority. The overall administration of the project is monitored by a steering committee, which is headed by a director. A field director is appointed for each reserve, who is assisted by a group of field and technical personnel.

 Shivalik-Terai Conservation Unit
 North-East Conservation Unit
 Sunderbans Conservation Unit
 Western Ghats Conservation Unit
 Eastern Ghats Conservation Unit
 Central India Conservation Unit
 Sariska Conservation Unit
 Kaziranga Conservation Unit

The various tiger reserves were created in the country based on the 'core-buffer' strategy:

 Core area: the core areas are free of all human activities. It has the legal status of a national park or wildlife sanctuary. It is kept free of biotic disturbances and forestry operations like a collection of minor forest produce, grazing, and other human disturbances are not allowed within.
 Buffer areas: the buffer areas are subjected to 'conservation-oriented land use'. They comprise forest and non-forest land. It is a multi-purpose use area with twin objectives of providing habitat supplement to spillover population of wild animals from the core conservation unit and providing site-specific co-developmental inputs to surrounding villages for relieving their impact on the core area.

The important thrust areas for the Plan period are:
Stepped-up protection/networking surveillance.
Voluntary relocation of people from core/critical tiger habitat to provide inviolate space for tiger.
Use of information technology in wildlife crime prevention.
Addressing human-wildlife conflicts.
Capacity building of frontier personnel.
Developing a national repository of camera trap tiger photographs with IDs.
Strengthening the regional offices of the NTCA.
Declaring and consolidating new tiger reserves.
Foresting awareness for eliciting new tiger reserves.
Foresting Research.

For each tiger reserve, management plans were drawn up based on the following principles:

 Elimination of all forms of human exploitation and biotic disturbance from the core area and rationalization of activities in the buffer zone
 Restricting the habitat management only to repair the damages done to the ecosystem by human and other interferences to facilitate recovery of the ecosystem to its natural state
 Monitoring the faunal and floral changes over time and carrying out research about wildlife

More than 1100 tigers were estimated to inhabit the reserves by 1984.

Wireless communication systems and outstation patrol camps have been developed within the tiger reserves, due to which poaching has declined considerably. Fire protection is effectively done by suitable preventive and control measures. Voluntary village relocation has been done in many reserves, especially from the core area. Livestock grazing has been controlled to a great extent in the tiger reserves. Various compensatory developmental works have improved the water regime and the ground and field level vegetation, thereby increasing the animal density. Research data about vegetation changes are also available from many reserves. Plans include the use of advanced information and communication technology in wildlife protection and crime management in tiger reserves, GIS-based digitized database development, and devising a new tiger habitat and population evaluation system.

Controversies and problems
Project Tiger's efforts were hampered by poaching, as well as debacles and irregularities in Sariska and Namdapha, both of which were reported extensively in the Indian media. The Forest Rights Act passed by the Indian government in 2006 recognizes the rights of some forest dwelling communities in forest areas. This has led to controversy over implications of such recognition for tiger conservation. Some have argued that this is problematic as it will increase conflict and opportunities for poaching; some also assert that "tigers and humans cannot co-exist". Others argue that this is a limited perspective that overlooks the reality of human-tiger coexistence and the abuse of power by authorities, evicting local people and making them pariahs in their own traditional lands rather than allowing them a proper role in decision-making, in the tiger crisis. The latter position was supported by the Government of India's Tiger Task Force, and is also taken by some forest dwellers' organizations.

See also
 List of Indian states by tiger population
 Indian Council of Forestry Research and Education
 Tiger poaching in India
 Tiger reserves of India
 Save China's Tigers
 Project Elephant
 Project Dolphin (India)

References

External links
 Project Tiger official website

Wildlife conservation in India
Tiger reserves of India
Tigers in India
1973 in India
Conservation projects